Fronto may refer to:
 Fronto (beetle), a genus of beetles in the tribe Hyperini
 Valencian frontó, a modified Valencian pilota version of the original Basque Pelota game
 a Roman cognomen
 Fronto of Emesa (3rd century), a famous rhetorician and uncle of Cassius Longinus
 Gaius Caristanius Fronto (1st century), a Roman soldier and equites whom Vespasian promoted to the Roman Senate
 Marcus Claudius Fronto (AD 170), a Roman senator and Consul, and a general in the Imperial Roman army 
 Marcus Cornelius Fronto (c. 100– late 160s), a Roman grammarian and rhetorician